Fatum  is a 1915 Dutch silent drama film directed by Theo Frenkel.

Cast
Louis Bouwmeester	... 	Kobus Drost
Wilhelmina Kleij	... 	Zus van Kobus Drost / Kobus Drost's sister
John Timrott	... 	Arend
August Van den Hoeck	... 	Kees Nieman
Heintje Davids	... 	Danseres / Dancer
Louis Davids	... 	Danspartner / Dance partner
Julia Ude	... 	Trijn
Aaf Bouber		
Piet Fuchs		
Coen Hissink		
Julie Meijer		(as Julia Frenkel-Meyer)
Jaap Van der Poll		
Yard Van Staalduynen

External links 
 

1915 films
Dutch silent feature films
Dutch black-and-white films
1915 drama films
Films directed by Theo Frenkel
Dutch drama films
Silent drama films